Peter Louis Cakü (23 March 1953 – 20 February 2020) was a Burmese Roman Catholic bishop.

Cakü was born in Myanmar and was ordained to the priesthood in 1982. He served as titular bishop of Abidda and as auxiliary bishop of the Roman Catholic Diocese of Kengtung, Myanmar, from 1997 to 2001. He then served as bishop of the Kengtung Diocese from 2001 until his death in 2020.

References

1953 births
2020 deaths
20th-century Roman Catholic bishops in Myanmar
21st-century Roman Catholic bishops in Myanmar